The 1957 Notre Dame Fighting Irish football team represented the University of Notre Dame during the 1957 NCAA University Division football season.
Notre Dame's 7–0 victory over Oklahoma snapped the Sooners' NCAA record 47-game winning streak.

Schedule

Team players drafted into the NFL

The following players were drafted into professional football following the season.

References

Notre Dame
Notre Dame Fighting Irish football seasons
Notre Dame Fighting Irish football